Wing of Fire is the first full-length album by American musician Robert Hazard, released in 1984 by RCA Records. It was released two years after his successful EP Robert Hazard. "Hard Hearted" was the only single from the album, and was released only in Canada. The album's sales and performance suffered due to too much management involvement, and after only selling 89,000 copies of the album, RCA dropped Hazard.

Critical reception
Trouser Press called Wing of Fire "a passable album, kind of Tom Petty-meets-Willy DeVille."

Track listing

Personnel 
Musicians

Robert Hazard – lead vocals, backing vocals, guitar
 Amelia Marie Jessie, Ziva Hertziliah Serkin – backing vocals
 David Woodford – baritone, tenor and alto saxophone (tracks 3 and 7)
 Michael Radcliffe – bass guitar
 Michael Pilla – guitar
 Ken Bernard – drums, electronic drums
 Jerry Weindel – keyboards
 Peter Smith – guitar
 Kae Williams Jr. – keyboards, bass synthesizer
 Gary Chang – synthesizer
 Paulinho da Costa – percussion

Technical

 David Bianco – engineer
 Jim Scott – assistant engineer
 Robert Hakalski – cover photography
 J.J. Stelmach – cover art
 Karen McKelvie, Steve Julty – inner sleeve photography
 Recorded and mixed at Record Plant, Los Angeles
 Mastered at Sterling Sound, New York

References 

1984 debut albums
RCA Records albums
Albums produced by David Kershenbaum